is a landmark decision of the Supreme Court of Canada in distinguishing relationships of partnership from those of employment.

Background
In 1979, McCormick became an equity partner at the law firm Fasken Martineau. Subsequently, in the 1980s, the equity partners voted to adopt a provision in their Partnership Agreement that required equity partners to retire as equity partners and divest their ownership shares at the end of the year in which they turned 65. A partner could make individual arrangements to continue working as an employee or as a "regular" (i.e., non-equity) partner, but such arrangements were stated in the Agreement to be the exception rather than the rule. In 2009, when he was 64, McCormick brought a complaint to the British Columbia Human Rights Tribunal arguing that this provision constituted age discrimination in employment, contrary to s. 13(1) of the province's Human Rights Code.

The law firm applied to have the complaint dismissed on the grounds that, as an equity partner, McCormick was not in a workplace relationship covered by the Code.

The tribunal and courts below

British Columbia Human Rights Tribunal
The Tribunal, based on the factors of utilization, control, financial burden, and remedial purpose used in previous decisions, concluded that an employment relationship did exist and therefore s. 13(1) applied:

Fasken "utilized" Mr. McCormick to provide legal services to the firm's clients and to generate intellectual property.
Fasken exercised control over Mr. McCormick through the direction given by managing partners and client and file managers.
Despite the fact that the partnership involves sharing profits rather than paying fixed wages, the firm nevertheless had the burden of determining and paying Mr. McCormick's compensation.
Allegations that Fasken treated Mr. McCormick differently because of his age engaged the broad remedial purposes of the Code.

British Columbia Supreme Court
Fasken's application for judicial review was dismissed by the British Columbia Supreme Court. In her ruling upholding the Tribunal's decision, Bruce J stated:

British Columbia Court of Appeal
The BCSC ruling was reversed on appeal. In her ruling, Levine JA observed that that ruling misinterpreted certain provisions of the BC Partnership Act, and declared:

At the Supreme Court of Canada
The appeal was dismissed with costs. Abella J, however, began her opinion with this observation:

While different lists of factors have been employed by Canadian tribunals and courts to determine whether an employment relationship exists, "the consistent animating themes are control and dependency." In that regard:

 Relying on a formalistic approach to a master and servant relationship resurrects an unduly restrictive traditional test for employment.
 The test is who is responsible for determining working conditions and financial benefits and to what extent does a worker have an influential say in those determinations? The more the work life of individuals is controlled, the greater their dependency and, consequently, their economic, social and psychological vulnerability in the workplace.
 The approach taken by the Supreme Court of the United States in similar cases was endorsed.

In summary, she noted:

"While the structure and protections normally associated with equity partnerships mean they will rarely be employment relationships for purposes of human rights legislation, this does not mean that form should trump substance." Applying the control/dependency test to McCormick's relationship with Fasken, it was determined that "he was part of the group that controlled the partnership, not a person vulnerable to its control." Therefore, the Code did not apply, but it was possible that discrimination claims can be addressed under the provisions of the Partnership Act, under which "[o]ne of the duties partners owe each other is the duty of utmost fairness and good faith":

Impact

McCormick was seen to be a landmark ruling that gives professional partnerships significant control over their ability to put time limits on their ownership. However, it also introduced a new way to determine whether someone is an employer or an employee. In describing the control/dependency test, the Court gave special mention to the factors listed in the U.S. case Clackamas Gastroenterology Associates, P. C. v. Wells:

 Whether the organization can hire or fire the individual or set the rules and regulations of the individual's work
 Whether and, if so, to what extent the organization supervises the individual's work
 Whether the individual reports to someone higher in the organization
 Whether and, if so, to what extent the individual is able to influence the organization
 Whether the parties intended that the individual be an employee, as expressed in written agreements or contracts
 Whether the individual shares in the profits, losses, and liabilities of the organization

The result in McCormick was case-specific, in that BC's Code was more restricted in scope compared to other jurisdictions such as Ontario's. However, the SCC's endorsement of a control/dependency test for determining partnership and employment relationships, together with its obiter observation about partners' duty of "utmost fairness and good faith" to each other, may encourage expanded litigation in this area. Other commentators have observed that the test can be used to determine whether an employment relationship exists in many different contexts (including independent contractors, shareholders, agents, or others that work for or with others but are not called "employees"), and non-equity partnerships could be the next battleground in defining their scope.

In the same week, the United Kingdom Supreme Court in Clyde & Co LLP v van Winklehof handed down a judgment that dealt with the same question as to whether a person was a "worker" within the scope of the Employment Rights Act 1996. While the result still revolved around the scope of the Act in question, it serves to remind that the determination of a partner's employment status may differ depending on the specific factual circumstances or applicable legislation. Significantly, the majority ruling concerning statutory interpretation by Lady Hale in Clyde & Co could be adopted in Canadian jurisprudence if minor changes are made to Canadian legislation.

References

2014 in Canadian case law
Supreme Court of Canada cases
Canadian civil rights case law
Canadian labour case law
Employment classifications